Aghze Poya is a town in the Federally Administered Tribal Areas of Pakistan. It is located at 33°9'18N 70°31'33E with an altitude of 580 metres (1906 feet).

References

Populated places in Khyber Pakhtunkhwa